Morchella americana is a species of fungus in the family Morchellaceae native to North America. Described as new to science in 2012, it is common east of the Rocky Mountains in a range stretching from Ontario south to Texas, Arkansas, Alabama, Georgia and South Carolina. In western North America, the species typically is found under hardwood, especially cottonwood trees in river bottoms, or with apple trees or ornamental ashes in urban settings. The specific epithet americana refers to its occurrence in North America.

In the Great Lakes region of eastern North America, the range of M. americana overlaps with M. ulmaria, which cannot be reliably distinguished from M. americana without DNA sampling.

Morchella americana, identified as phylogenetic species "Mes-4", has also been found in Turkey, France, and Germany, but is suspected of having been introduced there from North America.

In 2014, Richard et al. clarified the taxonomic status of this species, retaining the name Morchella americana of Clowez and Matherly(2012) over M. esculentoides.

References

External links

americana
Edible fungi
Fungi described in 2012
Fungi of North America